The South Plains Wind Farm, is located between Floydada, Texas and South Plains, Texas, on the high plains of the Llano Estacado in Floyd County. Completed in 2016, the wind farm was constructed in two phases that have a total generating capacity of 500.3 megawatts (MW).

Details 

The project was conceived and developed by Westerly Wind and purchased by First Wind in June 2014. First Wind was subsequently acquired by SunEdison in November 2014.  SunEdison financed the construction and selected Mortenson Construction to provide EPC services. In addition to erecting the wind turbines, each phase required the construction of new access roads, turbine foundations, collection lines, 345 kV electrical substation, and operations & maintenance building.

Phase I includes 100 Vestas V100 turbines, each rated at 2 MW, that collectively are capable of generating 200 MW. These turbines have a hub height of 80 meters and a blade rotor diameter of 100 meters. Construction began in spring of 2015 and the project was completed in November of the same year. The electricity produced annually is sufficient to service approximately 60,000 households.

Phase II includes 91 Vestas V117 turbines rated at 3.3 MW than can collectively generate 300.3 MW.  These more powerful turbines were the first of their kind to be installed in the United States, and have a hub height of 91.5 meters and a blade rotor diameter of 117 meters.  Construction began in July 2015 and completed in early 2016. The electricity produced can service approximately 90,000 homes.  

Hewlett Packard helped to enable construction of phase II by purchasing 112 MW of the power to supply its data centers in Texas with 100% renewable energy.  The remaining 188 MW is contracted to an affiliate of Citi.

Construction of the facility was complete by the time that SunEdison filed for Chapter 11 bankruptcy protection on April 21, 2016.  The company's yield co, TerraForm Power, retained its ownership of phase I.  Novatus Energy acquired phase II during the restructuring, and announced its selection of E.ON Energy Services to maintain and operate the facility.

Electricity production 

(*) partial year of operation
(ID) incomplete dataset

See also

Wind power in Texas
South Plains
List of wind farms in the United States

References

External links
VIDEO: SunEdison South Plains II Wind Farm at dusk
Public domain photos of West Texas and the Llano Estacado

Energy infrastructure completed in 2015
Energy infrastructure completed in 2016
Buildings and structures in Floyd County, Texas
Wind farms in Texas